Line L may refer to:
 L (New York City Subway service), a New York City subway line
 L-Line (Norfolk Southern), a rail line in North Carolina
 L Line (RTD), a light rail line in Denver
 L Taraval, a streetcar line in San Francisco
 L Line (Los Angeles Metro), a light rail line in Los Angeles County, California
 L (Los Angeles Railway), a former streetcar line in Los Angeles

See also
 Chicago "L", the Chicago rapid transit system
 Market-Frankford Line in Philadelphia, known as “the El”
 Ł, letter in the Polish alphabet
 L series (disambiguation)